The Ministry of Commerce (Abrv: MOC;) is a cabinet ministry in the government of Thailand. The Minister of Commerce is a member of the Cabinet of Thailand. The ministry is responsible for trade, prices of important agricultural goods, consumer protection, entrepreneurship, insurance, intellectual property protection, exports, and representing Thailand at the World Trade Organization. The ministry was founded in 1892 by King Chulalongkorn (Rama V), by separating the ministry from the Ministry of Agriculture and Cooperatives. The ministry moved to its present premises in Nonthaburi in 1989.

Governance and budget
, the Minister of Commerce is Jurin Laksanawisit. His deputy minister is Weerasak Wangsuphakijkosol.

MOC's budget for FY2019 is 6,889 million baht. About one-third of that figure is allocated to trade promotion.

Departments

Administration
 Office of the Minister
 Office of the Permanent Secretary

Dependent departments
 Department of Trade Negotiations
 Department of Business Development
 Department of International Trade Promotion (DITP): Five offices in Thailand and 61 Thai Trade Centers abroad.
 Department of Foreign Trade (DFT)
 Department of Intellectual Property (DIP)
 Department of Internal Trade (DIT)
Central Bureau of Weights and Measures (CBWM)
Trade Competition Board (1999–2017)

State enterprises
 Public Warehouse Organization (PWO)

Public organizations
 The Gem and Jewelry Institute of Thailand (Public Organization)
 The Support Arts and Crafts International Centre of Thailand (Public Organization)
 International Institute for Trade and Development

See also
Economy of Thailand
Foreign Business Act of 1999 (Thailand)
Cabinet of Thailand
List of Government Ministers of Thailand
Government of Thailand

References

 
Commerce
Economy of Thailand
Thailand, Commerce
1892 establishments in Siam